The third season of Australia's I'm a Celebrity...Get Me Out of Here, which was commissioned by Network Ten on 1 August 2016, premiered on 29 January 2017. Casey Donovan won the series, beating Natalie Bassingthwaighte and footballer Dane Swan, and was crowned the first ever "Queen of the Jungle", the $100,000 prize money, was won for her selected charity, the Starlight Children's Foundation .

Celebrities

Celebrity guests

Results and elimination
 Indicates that the celebrity received the most votes from the public
 Indicates that the celebrity was immune from the vote
 Indicates that the celebrity was named as being in the bottom 2, 3
  Indicates that the celebrity received the fewest votes and was eliminated immediately (no bottom three)

Tucker Trials

The contestants take part in daily trials to earn food. These trials aim to test both physical and mental abilities. Success is usually determined by the number of stars collected during the trial, with each star representing a meal earned by the winning contestant for their camp mates.

 The public voted for who they wanted to face the trial
 The contestants decided who did which trial
 The trial was compulsory and neither the public nor celebrities decided who took part 
 The contestants were chosen by the evicted celebrities
 The voting for the trial was of dual origin - see note for details.

Notes
The winning team of this tucker trial received; the quickest way into camp, their choice of bed in the camp & a pillow.
Tom was voted by Australia to do this Tucker Trial but was told six people are involved in it and he had to choose the other five to join him.
Casey & Ash had to decide which celebrities would be involved in this Tucker Trial.
This trial was used in the second season of the show with Laurina Fleure also winning 12/12 stars, however, this time two celebrities competed with double the number of snakes.
During the trial, they failed one meal but succeeded in the rest giving them 10/11 stars, but were given the option to have Chris Brown & Osher Günsberg to have an extra meal, they accepted and Chris & Osher succeeded in this, which gave them the 11th star.
As a new celebrity, Keira was automatically placed in the trial. Voting took place for a second celebrity to join her in the trial. Australia voted for Dane to be a part of the trial.
The trial involved 2 celebrities versing each other throughout 6 rounds, the celebrity who wins went into the winners circle and the celebrity that lost went into the losers circle, ending with 6 celebrities in each group. The winners received a share in a family meat pie with tomato sauce & quickest way into camp, whilst the losers only received beans and rice.
Keira & Steve got to choose a celebrity to join them as support (Steve chose Ash, Keira chose Lisa). In the trial, Steve & Keira would face-off against each other. The winner would return to camp with 10 stars while the celebrity that loses the trial, and their supporter, would be exiled to Skull Cave.
Even though they won six stars during this trial, the stars became null and void after their dinner was provided by fast food restaurant KFC.
This was the first trial to be done at night.
This trial was a quiz, it did not involve the remaining celebrities but the evicted celebrities instead, each of the celebrities had to individually give an answer to a question from a category (e.g. Sport, Movies etc.), if the answer was correct the remaining celebrities would receive half a star. five out of nine celebrities answered correctly.
this was Nazeem's 14th tucker trial, making him the current world record holder for the most bushtucker trials competed by a person.

Celebrity Chest Challenges

Two or more celebrities are chosen to take part in the "Celebrity Chest" challenge to win luxuries for camp. Each challenge involves completing a task to win a chest to take back to camp. However, to win the luxury item in the chest, the campmates must correctly answer a question. If they fail to answer correctly, the luxury item is forfeited and a joke prize is won. The luxury item is "donated" by a celebrity from the outside.

 The celebrities got the question correct
 The celebrities got the question wrong

Skull Cave
Two or more celebrities are chosen to spend the night in the "Skull Cave", where they have no bed, bean & rice rations only and no contact with the other celebrities. If the celebrities successfully spend the entire night in the cave they will win a prize for the camp.

 The celebrities stayed the entire night
 The celebrities did not stay the night
 Saved from staying in the cave

In the first trial, there were two teams, in the trial the prize included pillows for the winning teams celebrities, Ash & Casey's team did not win and this was their second chance to win pillows for their team
 As a result, for losing the twentieth trial, Steve & his supporter Ash were exiled to Skull Cave. However, in a twist, the 10 campers were told they could save Ash & Steve from the Skull Cave but forfeit the 10 stars or let them stay there and receive them. The celebrities saved Ash & Steve from Skull Cave and forfeited their stars.

Camp Leader
Each celebrity in camp must vote for who they want to be Camp Leader, the celebrity who receives the most votes becomes the new Camp Leader
 Voted in as Camp Leader

Ratings

Ratings data is from OzTAM and represents the live and same day average viewership from the 5 largest Australian metropolitan centres (Sydney, Melbourne, Brisbane, Perth and Adelaide).

References

03
2017 Australian television seasons